Admiral Sir John Kingcome, KCB (14 February 1793 – 7 August 1871) was a Royal Navy officer who went on to be Commander-in-Chief, Pacific Station.

Naval career

Kingcome joined the Royal Navy in 1808 and was present at the destruction of the French ships during the Battle of the Basque Roads the following year. He also served in the First Anglo-Burmese War from 1824 to 1826.

Promoted to Captain in 1838, he commanded HMS Belleisle during the First Opium War in 1841. He later took charge of HMS Simoom and HMS St George and then commanded HMS Royal William in the Baltic Sea during the Crimean War. He was appointed Commander-in-Chief, Pacific Station in 1862 and was made full Admiral on the Reserved List in 1869.

Kingcome Inlet on the British Columbia Coast is named after him as are other placenames in the area.

See also
Kingcome (disambiguation)

References

External links
 

1793 births
1871 deaths
Royal Navy admirals
Knights Commander of the Order of the Bath